19th SFBAFCC Awards
January 18, 2021

Picture: 
Nomadland

Animated Feature: 
Soul

Documentary: 
Collective

Foreign Language Picture: 
Another Round

The 19th San Francisco Bay Area Film Critics Circle Awards, honoring the best in film for 2020, were given on January 18, 2021.

Winners and nominees

These are the nominees for the 19th SFFCC Awards. Winners are listed at the top of each list:

Special awards

Special Citation for Independent Cinema
 La Llorona, directed by Jayro Bustamante (TIE)
 S#!%house, directed by Cooper Raiff (TIE)
 The Last Tree, directed by Shola Amoo

Marlon Riggs Award
 Dawn Porter

References

External links
 San Francisco Bay Area Film Critics Circle

San Francisco Film Critics Circle Awards
2020 film awards
2020 in San Francisco